Kadhalukku Mariyadhai is a 1997 Indian Tamil-language musical romantic drama film directed by Fazil. It is the Tamil remake of Fazil's own Malayalam film Aniyathipraavu (1997). The film stars Vijay and Shalini (reprising her role from the original) while Sivakumar, Srividya, Manivannan, Dhamu, Charle, Thalaivasal Vijay and Radha Ravi play supporting roles. The film tells the story of a couple of differing backgrounds and beliefs and how they unite amidst the opposition of their families. The music was composed by Ilaiyaraaja with cinematography by Anandakuttan. The film was released on 19 December 1997. It received positive reviews and became a box-office blockbuster. It was also Shalini’s first Tamil film as a leading actress, having previously acted as a child artist.

Plot 
Jeevanantham "Jeeva" is a rich youth who has just completed his B.Com. Although his parents want him to marry a girl and settle down, Jeeva prefers to pursue MBA studies instead and is not interested in marriage. But his attitude changes when he meets Mini, a Christian girl who is a final year B.Com student, at a book store. He instantly falls in love with her. After a few incidents, he succeeds in winning Mini's heart.

However, Mini's elder brothers, a doctor named James, a police officer named Stephen, and a local goon named Thomas, who are all overprotective of her, eventually find out about their sister's relationship with Jeeva, and are furious. They thrash Jeeva, as well as his friends Kesavan and Raghavan, and warn Jeeva never to come near Mini. Undaunted, Jeeva takes Mini to his house, where Jeeva's father Rajshekhar too disapproves of their relationship, and throws them out of the house. Kesavan and Raghavan take the couple to their slum near Pondicherry, where Kesavan explains their situation to his father, who is a fisherman. Kesavan's father agrees to let the couple stay in his house, and also defends them from Mini's brothers, when they come to the slum to kill Jeeva. Later, Kesavan's father decides to get Jeeva and Mini married, but by now Jeeva and Mini have developed second thoughts about their relationship as their families are against it. They decide to break up and return to their families, which is accepted by Kesavan, his father and Raghavan. But despite breaking up, Jeeva and Mini cannot forget each other.

Meanwhile, Mini's marriage is fixed with someone else. Jeeva's mother decides to meet Mini before she gets married, so that she can get a better wife for Jeeva. Jeeva, his parents, as well as Kesavan and Raghavan, go to Mini's house, where both families apologise to each other for what had happened. But when Jeeva and his family are about to leave, Jeeva's mother breaks down and requests Mini's family to get Mini married to Jeeva. Mini's family, including her brothers, agree to this. Jeeva and Mini are happily reunited.

Cast

Production 
Kadhalukku Mariyadhai is a Tamil remake of Fazil's own Malayalam film Aniyathipraavu. Initially, he was keen on casting a debutant in the lead female role, but Shalini, the lead actress of the original insisted that she should also star in the remake. Fazil initially approached Abbas for the lead role, but due to mismanagement created by Abbas' manager with call sheets, Vijay was selected instead.

Soundtrack 
The soundtrack has been scored by Ilaiyaraaja, with lyrics written by Palani Bharathi. Ilaiyaraaja reused five of the songs from this film in Preminchedi Endukamma? (1999).

Release and reception 
The film was released on 19 December 1997. A reviewer from The Hindu mentioned that "Vijay brings to surface the soft nature of the love", while adding that the rest of the cast makes "fine contributions", and praising the director's work. P. Balan from Indolink.com recommended the film and citing that "Shalini returns in this film with a good performance" and that Ilaiyaraaja's music is "unbelievable". He went on to praise the performance of the other lead actors and Fazil's direction. K. Vijiyan of New Straits Times wrote "This is a movie for the whole family". Ananda Vikatan rated the film 50 out of 100. The film saw Vijay win the Tamil Nadu State Film Award for Best Actor alongside Parthiban, while Palani Bharathi won the Tamil Nadu State Film Award for Best Lyricist.

Legacy 
Entertainment portal Behindwoods placed the film in first place in "Top 20 Best Films of Vijay" and also placed in "Top 20 Best Love Stories In Tamil". Scenes from the film was spoofed in Thamizh Padam (2010). Shiva (played by Shiva) and a girl will be taking the same book Love and Love Only in a same way similar to the pair in the film, but shock awaits as the girl turns out to be married.

References

External links 
 

1990s Tamil-language films
1997 films
Films directed by Fazil
Films scored by Ilaiyaraaja
Indian interfaith romance films
Tamil remakes of Malayalam films